Nordstromia grisearia is a moth in the family Drepanidae. It was described by Otto Staudinger in 1892. It is found in the Russian Far East (Amur Oblast), Japan and China (Sichuan, Fujian).

The larvae feed on Fagus and Quercus species.

References

Moths described in 1892
Drepaninae